The Letter is a 1997 South Korean film starring Choi Jin-sil and Park Shin-yang.

Story 
A happily married couple see only good days ahead of them; but the husband discovers that he is dying of cancer. Heartbroken at the possibility of leaving his wife behind, he proceeds to write love letters aimed at consoling his wife.

Cast 
 Choi Jin-sil as Jung-in
 Park Shin-yang as Hwan-yoo
 Choi Yong-min 
 Lee Jun-seop 
 Song Gwang-su 
 Nam Sang-mi 
 Park Jong-cheol 
 Lee Sang-u 
 Kim Young-dae 
 Lee In-ock

Release 
The Letter was released in South Korea on 22 November 1997, and received a total of 724,474 admissions to make it the best selling domestic production and fourth film overall of that year. Together with The Contact it was only one of two films since 1993 to break the 600,000 admissions mark.

Remake
 The Letter ("เดอะ เลตเตอร์ จดหมายรัก"), a 2004 Thai remake starring  Anne Thongprasom and Attaporn Teemakorn.

See also 
 P.S. I Love You (film)

References

External links 
 
 

1997 films
1990s Korean-language films
South Korean romantic drama films
South Korean films remade in other languages